The 1969–70 1re série season was the 49th season of the 1re série, the top level of ice hockey in France. Chamonix Hockey Club won their 25th league title.

Final ranking
 1st place: Chamonix Hockey Club
 2nd place: Sporting Hockey Club Saint Gervais
 3rd place: Ours de Villard-de-Lans
 4th place: Athletic Club de Boulogne-Billancourt
 5th place: Gap Hockey Club
 6th place: US Métro
 7th place: Français Volants
 8th place: CPM Croix
 9th place: CSG Grenoble
 10th place: Club des Sports de Megève
 11th place: CSG Paris
 12th place: Diables Rouges de Briançon
 13th place: ?
 14th place: ?
 15th place: Club des patineurs lyonnais
 16th place: ?
 17th place: ASPP Paris
 18th place: Hockey Club de Reims
 19th place: ?
 20th place: Pralognan-la-Vanoise
 21st place: Les Houches
 22nd place: HC Amiens Somme
 23rd place: Grenoble UNI

External links
List of French champions on hockeyarchives.info

France
1969–70 in French ice hockey
Ligue Magnus seasons